Kamalabad-e Pain (also Romanized as Kamālābād-e Pā’īn; also known as Kamālābād-e Soflá) is a village in Mashhad-e Miqan Rural District, in the Central District of Arak County, Markazi Province, Iran. At the 2006 census, its population was 280, in 88 families.

References 

Populated places in Arak County